Joel Alme (born 1980) is a musician and artist from Gothenburg, Sweden. Alme released his debut album A Master of Ceremonies on 22 April 2008 with "Queen's Corner" being the single. In 2010 he released his second studio album, called Waiting for the Bells. He is the former lead singer for Spring in Paris.

When Alme received grant money from the Swedish Arts Council (Kulturrådet) for his second album Waiting for the Bells. Regarding the grant money, Alme stated that "it enabled me to use a real strings orchestra and I could spend more time in a very good studio with a good producer, Mattias Glavå."

In 2009, Alme altered the lyrics to his song "A Young Summer's Youth" and produced the song "Snart skiner Poseidon" to be played before and after all IFK Göteborg's home matches where it is performed by a massed chorus of supporters.

In 2015, Alme released Flyktligan – his first album in Swedish. Most of the songs on that album are about his background and upbringing.

Discography

Albums

References

1980 births
Living people
Swedish pop singers
Swedish-language singers
21st-century Swedish singers
21st-century Swedish male singers